Edward Vivian Scobie (23 May 1918 – 14 November 1996) was a Dominican-born journalist, magazine publisher and historian. He is best known for his research into the history of black people in Western Europe and his 1972 seminal book Black Britannia: A History of Blacks in Britain.

Early life and career
Scobie was born Vivian Edward George Dalrymple in Roseau, Dominica. He was educated at the Dominica Grammar School. At school, he displayed an aptitude for athletics, eventually representing the national teams in cricket and football. He first went to England during World War II to join the Royal Air Force, where he served as a pilot in Bomber Command, holding the rank of flight lieutenant.
After the war Scobie became a correspondent for the Chicago Defender and other Johnson Publishing Company titles with a largely African-American readership.

In 1948, Scobie published Checkers, calling itself "Britain's Premier Negro Magazine"; the magazine only lasted five issues, folding in January 1949.
By 1960, Scobie joined with Charles I. Ross and Patrick Williams to produce monthly magazine Tropic. Published in London, the magazine announced that it intended to be "the voice of 250,000 coloured people in Britain", aligning itself with "coloured people everywhere in their struggle for Independence. In their fight to live with dignity and freedom". In addition to covering politics and current affairs in Britain, Africa and the Caribbean, the magazine published short stories by the likes of Samuel Selvon, Jan Carew and Winston Whyte, and included among its contributors George Lamming and Donald Hinds. Tropic ceased publication at the end of 1960.

In September 1961 Scobie launched Flamingo as editor, a monthly London-based magazine aimed at Black people in Britain and internationally, focusing on glamour, culture, sex advice and international politics, it was one of the first magazines to target Britain's African-Caribbean community. Flamingo was part-funded by the British Secret Intelligence Service (MI6), through founder Peter Hornsby and publisher Chalton Publishing, who along with the CIA wanted to support left-leaning writers and politicians who would oppose communism. It is unclear if Scobie was aware of this funding. The second issue claimed to have sold 20,000 copies in Britain and 15,000 in America. By 1964 Flamingo political articles had become more serious, and were similar to media releases from the British Foreign Office's semi-secret Information Research Department. Flamingo closed in May 1965.

Scobie's first book, Black Britannia: The History of Blacks in Britain published in 1972, brought him "international acclaim". Black Britannia is the first book-length history of African presence in Britain. He was also the author of Global African Presence (1994), and wrote many articles and essays, including for the Journal of African Civilizations. 
/
At the time of his death in 1996, Scobie was Professor Emeritus of History in the Black Studies Department at City College of New York.

Legacy

In 1998, Scobie was honoured on a commemorative postage stamp, which featured portraits of five notable Dominicans who served in the RAF during World War II, to mark the 80th anniversary of the Royal Air Force.

Selected bibliography
 Black Britannia: The History of Blacks in Britain (1972), Johnson Press, .
 Global African Presence (1994), A & B Books, .

References

1918 births
1996 deaths
20th-century British historians
British magazine editors
British World War II bomber pilots
British World War II pilots
Dominica expatriates in the United Kingdom
Dominica expatriates in the United States
Dominica historians
Dominica male writers
Historians of slavery
Magazine publishers (people)
Male journalists
People from Roseau
Royal Air Force personnel of World War II